John Clarkin (born 1872) was a Scottish footballer. His regular position was as a forward. He was born in Neilston. He played for Neilston, Bootle, Glasgow Thistle, Newton Heath and Blackpool.

Blackpool
Neilston-born Clarkin signed for Blackpool from Newton Heath in June 1896. He made his debut for the club in their first-ever match in the Football League, on 5 September 1896 (see Blackpool F.C. season 1896–97). He went on to appear in 28 of the club's 30 games that season, scoring eight goals.

The following season, 1897–98, Clarkin made 26 appearances and scored five goals.

References

External links
Profile at StretfordEnd.co.uk
Profile at MUFCInfo.com

1872 births
People from Neilston
Scottish footballers
Neilston Juniors F.C. players
Bootle F.C. (1879) players
Manchester United F.C. players
Blackpool F.C. players
Year of death missing
Association football forwards
English Football League players
Thistle F.C. players
Sportspeople from East Renfrewshire